Macara is a genus of moths in the family Megalopygidae.

Species
Macara alydda (Druce, 1887)
Macara alydda nigella (Dognin, 1916)
Macara argentea (Druce, 1897)
Macara dyari Dognin, 1914
Macara heinrichi Hopp, 1928
Macara interpunctosa Dognin, 1914
Macara nigripes (Dyar, 1909)
Macara pasaleuca (Maassen, 1899)
Macara purens (Schaus, 1905) 
Macara terena Dognin, 1914

References

Megalopygidae
Megalopygidae genera